Rue de Seine is a street in the 6th arrondissement of Paris.

Rue de Seine is one of the most sought after streets in Paris due to its history and very close proximity to the Louvre and other famous Parisian landmarks.

The rue de Seine and surrounding streets are host to the highest concentration of art galleries and antique dealers in the world.

Other nearby famous landmarks include the Café de Flore, Les Deux Magots and the beautiful Jardin du Luxembourg. The neighbourhood of Rue de Seine also includes famous fashion houses, such as Dior, Yves Saint Laurent and Hugo Boss.

The Hotel La Louisiane at 60 rue de Seine is famous for having accommodated many notable jazz musicians and writers, including Miles Davis, Chet Baker, John Coltrane, Ernest Hemingway, Jean-Paul Sartre and Simone de Beauvoir. Rue de Seine is the title of a 2006 album by Martial Solal and Dave Douglas.

In the French novel La Duchesse de Langeais by Honoré de Balzac, the aristocratic character Marquess Armand de Montriveau lived in Rue de Seine.

Rue de Seine is the theme and title of a poem by the famous French poet Jacques Prévert.

It is also referenced by Julio Cortazar in the first paragraph of his novel Hopscotch (Rayuela).

It is also famous for Guy Debord's 1953 anticapitalist graffiti Ne travaillez jamais (Don't ever work).

Notable residents
Count D'Artagnan, captain of the Musketeers of the Guard who died during the Franco-Dutch war, lived at number 25 rue de Seine.
Charles Baudelaire, French poet who lived at number 57 and number 27 rue de Seine.
Jacques Borker, 20th century French artist.
Raymond Duncan, American dancer, philosopher, artist and brother of Isadora Duncan lived at number 51 rue de Seine
Amantine-Lucile-Aurore Dupin known as "George Sand", French novelist known for her numerous affairs with celebrities including Frederic Chopin, lived at number 52 rue de Seine
Marcello Mastroianni, Italian film actor
Adam Bernard Mickiewicz, Polish poet
Claude-Louis Navier, French engineer and physicist who specialized in mechanics
St. Vincent de Paul, priest of the Catholic Church who was venerated as a saint in the Catholic Church and the Anglican Communion and known as the "Great Apostle of Charity", lived at number 1 rue de Seine.

References